La Virgencita de madera is a 1937  Argentine film directed by Sebastián Naón.

Cast
Alberto Bello
Chola Bosch
Carlos Castro (Castrito)
Inés Edmonson

External links

1937 films
1930s Spanish-language films
Argentine black-and-white films
1930s romantic comedy-drama films
Argentine romantic comedy-drama films
1937 comedy films
1937 drama films
1930s Argentine films